is a passenger railway station  located in Kawasaki-ku, Kawasaki, Kanagawa Prefecture, Japan, operated by East Japan Railway Company (JR East). It is also a freight depot for the Japan Freight Railway Company (JR Freight).

Lines

Station layout
The station consists of a single side platform serving bi-directional traffic. The station is unattended.

Platforms

History
Ōgimachi Station was opened on 20 July 1924 as a station on the privately held  initially for freight operations only. Passenger services were started from 28 October 1930. The line was nationalized on 1 July 1943 and was absorbed into the Japanese Government Railways network. The station has been unstaffed since 1 March 1971. Upon the privatization of the Japanese National Railways (JNR) on 1 April 1987 the station has been jointly operated by JR East and Japan Freight Railway Company.

Passenger statistics
In fiscal 2008, the station was used by an average of 611 passengers daily (boarding passengers only).

Surrounding area
 Showa Showa Denko Gas Products Kawasaki Factory
 Mitsui Wharf
 JXTG Energy Kawasaki Plant (formerly Mitsubishi Oil Kawasaki Refinery)
 Kawasaki Natural Gas Power Generation Kawasaki Natural Gas Power Generation
 JR East Kawasaki Thermal Power Station

See also
 List of railway stations in Japan

References

External links

 Ōgimachi Station 

Railway stations in Kanagawa Prefecture
Railway stations in Japan opened in 1928
Stations of East Japan Railway Company
Stations of Japan Freight Railway Company
Railway stations in Kawasaki, Kanagawa